Arthur Masters (17 August 1910 – 1998) was an English footballer who played as a forward for Horwich R.M.I., Nottingham Forest, and Port Vale in the 1930s.

Career
Masters played for Horwich R.M.I. and Nottingham Forest, before joining Port Vale in exchange for Allan Todd in June 1937. He scored eight goals in 33 Third Division North and two FA Cup appearances in the 1937–38 season. He was twice knocked out in a 1–1 draw with Crewe Alexandra at The Old Recreation Ground on 19 January; perhaps not surprisingly, he later said that he had no recollection of the game. He then scored five goals in Third Division South 33 games in the 1938–39 season, before leaving the "Valiants".

Career statistics
Source:

References

1910 births
1998 deaths
Sportspeople from Chorley
English footballers
Association football forwards
Leigh Genesis F.C. players
Nottingham Forest F.C. players
Port Vale F.C. players
English Football League players